The Bob Morrison Show is an Australian sitcom that screened on the Nine Network in 1994.

The Bob Morrison Show is the story of an ordinary family from through the eyes of their pet dog, Bob Morrison. Bob is an adorable stray that is welcomed by the youngest member of the Morrison clan, Ben, but he has a tough time winning over the rest of the family.

Cast
 Andy Anderson as Steve Morrison
 Nikki Coghill as Lizzy Morrison
 Christopher Lyons as Ben Morrison
 Elissa Elliot as Maxine Morrison
 Matt Day as Jake Duffy
 Stig Wemyss as the voice of Bob

See also 
 List of Australian television series

External links 
 
The Bob Morrison Show at Australian Television

1994 Australian television series debuts
1994 Australian television series endings
Australian television sitcoms
Nine Network original programming
Television series by Endemol Australia